Anisochirus is a genus of ground beetle first described by René Jeannel in 1946.

Species 
Anisochirus contains the following ten species:

 Anisochirus imerinae Jeannel, 1948
 Anisochirus impressicollis Jeannel, 1948
 Anisochirus lampronotus (Jeannel, 1948)
 Anisochirus madagascariensis (Dejean, 1831)
 Anisochirus obtusiusculus Jeannel, 1948
 Anisochirus pachys Jeannel, 1948
 Anisochirus seyrigi Jeannel, 1948
 Anisochirus sinuatipennis Jeannel, 1948
 Anisochirus stricticollis Jeannel, 1948
 Anisochirus tenuestriatus Jeannel, 1948

References

Further reading 

Harpalinae
Insects described in 1946